Robin Sutcliffe Allan (7 September 1900 – 5 July 1966) was a New Zealand geologist and university professor. The university professor William Salmond was his grandfather.

In 1953, Allan was awarded the Queen Elizabeth II Coronation Medal. The Allan Hills in Antarctica, mapped by the New Zealand party (1957–58) of the Commonwealth Trans-Antarctic Expedition, were named in his honour.

References

1900 births
1966 deaths
20th-century New Zealand geologists
Academic staff of the University of Canterbury
Presidents of the Royal Society of New Zealand
University of Otago alumni
Salmond family